Roerdalen is a municipality in the southeastern Netherlands, in the province of Limburg.

Roerdalen is the renaming of the municipality of Melick en Herkenbosch in 1993.

Population centres

Topography

Dutch Topographic map of the municipality of Roerdalen, June 2015

Notable people 
 Hubert Biermans (1864 in Herkenbosch - 1953) a Dutch and Canadian businessman
 Connie Palmen (born 1955 in Sint Odiliënberg) a Dutch author
 Geert Chatrou (born 1969 in Sint Odiliënberg) a professional whistler
 Jos Verstappen (born 1972 in Montfort) a Dutch former racing driver
 Joeri Verlinden (born 1988 in Melick) a Dutch swimmer, competed at the 2016 Summer Olympics

Gallery

References

External links 

 Official website

 
Municipalities of Limburg (Netherlands)
Municipalities of the Netherlands established in 1993